V. Vijayasai Reddy (born 1 July 1957) is the Member of Parliament, Rajya Sabha, Chairman of the Parliamentary Standing Committee on Commerce, Parliamentary Party Leader, The National General Secretary of YSR Congress Party and Chartered Accountant.

Life and work
Venumbaka Vijayasai Reddy was born on 1 July 1957 in Tallapudi in the Nellore district of Andhra Pradesh. He completed his chartered accountancy in Chennai and later set up his own firm with offices in Chennai, Bangalore and Hyderabad. He is married to Sunanda, and he then later adopted a child and named Neha.
Mr. Vijayasai served as Member of Board of Trustees of Tirumala Tirupati Devasthanams, Tirupati, for two consecutive Terms (GO Rt No. 1221 dated 08.2006).

Mr. Vijayasai, also financial advisor of Jagan's Group of companies and family auditor of former Andhra Pradesh Chief Minister late Y S Rajasekhara Reddy.

He also served on the board of several state government undertakings in addition to a stint as the Director of the Oriental Bank of Commerce.

Member of Parliament
In June 2016, he was the candidate for the Rajya Sabha seat from Andhra Pradesh and was elected unopposed.
He has introduced ten Private Member Bills in the Parliament.
 In December 2016, Mr. Reddy introduced a Private Member Bill to amend the Constitution of India (Articles 102 and 191) to enable the Parliament to make any law containing special provisions concerning the elected members of either House of Parliament and state assembly/council with regard to the date of disqualification. This was in order to provide a fixed time-frame for disqualification of members in case of defection.
 In July 2017, Mr. Reddy introduced a Private Member Bill in the Rajya Sabha aimed at protecting couples from honour killings  and providing legal assistance to inter-religious and inter-caste couples facing harassment.
 In December 2017, Mr. Reddy introduced an amendment to the Constitution to make the right to health a fundamental right.
 In December 2017, Mr. Reddy introduced the Prevention of Torture Bill which would fulfill India's commitment to ratify the United Nations Convention against Torture.
 In December 2017, Mr. Reddy introduced the Prevention of Enforced Disappearance Bill which would fulfill India's commitment to ratify the International Convention for the Protection of All Persons from Enforced Disappearance.
 In January 2018, Mr. Reddy introduced two Bills seeking amendments to the Constitution to give reservation to Other Backward Classes in the legislatures, educational institutions and government jobs in proportion to their population.
As a Member of Parliament, Mr. Reddy serves in the Standing Committee for Rules, and Petroleum & Natural Gas.

See also 
Rajya Sabha members from Andhra Pradesh

References

 
Living people
YSR Congress Party politicians
Telugu politicians
1957 births